Ellsworth Scientific Station (or simply Estación Ellsworth or Base Ellsworth) was a permanent, all year-round originally American, then Argentine Antarctic scientific research station named after American polar explorer Lincoln Ellsworth. It was located on Gould Bay, on the Filchner Ice Shelf.

It was shut down in 1962 over safety concerns due to it being built on increasingly unstable ice, which produced fast deterioration of its superstructures and endangered both personnel and equipment.

History
Ellsworth Station was built by United States Navy Seabees under the command of Captain Finn Ronne, with the support of the icebreakers USS Staten Island and USS Wyandot, captained by Francis Gambacorta.
The originally planned site for the station was Cape Adams, but when the terrain proved impractical due to huge ice cliffs, an alternate location on Gould Bay was selected, on the western coast of the Weddell Sea over the Filchner Ice Shelf, and close to the Argentinean Belgrano I Base.

Part of the scheduled agenda for the International Geophysical Year, Ellsworth Station was commissioned on 11 February 1957 and less than two years later, on 17 January 1959, was handed over to the Argentinean Antarctic Institute. Along with the handover, the United States government gave all the buildings, facilities, and existing food supplies while Argentina provided the logistical and administrative services necessary for the continued operation of the station. It was agreed that scientists of both countries would work together at the place in technical studies and scientific research.

On 31 December 1959, the Argentinean icebreaker ARA General San Martín was heading to Ellsworth Station to exchange personnel deliver and consumables when it received a SOS signal from the Norwegian–South African exploration ship Polarbjorn, which had gotten stuck in ice. The Argentineans managed to set the ship free so it could follow with its planned route along the coastline, However, the General San Martín was later unable to reach its own primary goal—located on the deepest recess of the Weddell Sea—due to unusually thick pack ice on the target area.

On 6 January 1962, Frigate Captain Hermes Quijada of the Argentine Naval Aviation, leading a two-plane flight of Douglas C-47s, made a stopover at Ellsworth Base before continuing to the South Pole. He became the pilot of the first airplane that had taken off from the Americas, and then landed at the South Pole.

Feasibility of the station came into question when structural problems caused by the unstable ice had the base half-sunken during most of the spring. To protect personnel and equipment, Ellsworth base was closed and all of its staff and equipment were evacuated on 30 December 1962, during the 1962–63 antarctic summer campaign. It continued to be inspected periodically by Argentinean exploration teams: it was eventually covered by snow and ice. The Filchner Shelf sector where it was located as split off a giant iceberg, and then it drifted through the Southern Ocean, where the base's remains have been lost at sea.

Description
The original facilities at Ellsworth Station could house over 40 people.

Scientific activities
During its operational days a number of experiments and observations were carried out at Ellsworth, involving ionospheric riometry observations; biology; human physiology; and surface and high-atmosphere meteorology, including radiation and carbon dioxide measurements.

There was also active research involving glaciology at the Filchner Ice Shelf, which was explored by several expeditions launched from the station. Some of these patrols reached the West Crevice on the huge barrier, completing the Ellsworth–Belgrano triangulation.

Climate
The area is a passage of weather fronts directed towards the north: although they do not precipitate, they do produce strong winds exceeding  which radically lower the apparent temperature.

See also
 Argentine Antarctica
 List of Antarctic research stations
 List of Antarctic field camps
McMurdo Station
South Pole Station
Byrd Station
Palmer Station
Siple Station
Operation Deep Freeze
Brockton Station
Eights Station
Plateau Station
Hallett Station
Little America V

References

Citations

Articles
 

Books

External links
 Fundaciòn Marambio – Base Ellsworth 
 Dirección Nacional del Antártico

Populated places established in 1957
Outposts of Edith Ronne Land
United States Antarctic Program
1957 establishments in Antarctica
1962 disestablishments in Antarctica